The 1964–67 Nordic Football Championship was the ninth tournament staged. Four Nordic countries participated: Denmark, Finland, Norway and Sweden. Sweden won the tournament, its seventh Nordic Championship win.

Results

1964

1965

1966

1967

Table
The table is compiled by awarding two points for a victory, one point for a draw, and no points for a loss.

Winners

Statistics

Goalscorers

See also
Balkan CupBaltic CupCentral European International CupMediterranean Cup

References

External links
RSSSF archives

1964
1964–65 in European football
1965–66 in European football
1966–67 in European football
1964 in Swedish football
1965 in Swedish football
1966 in Swedish football
1967 in Swedish football
1964 in Danish football
1965 in Danish football
1966 in Danish football
1967 in Danish football
1964 in Norwegian football
1965 in Norwegian football 
1966 in Norwegian football 
1967 in Norwegian football
1964 in Finnish football
1965 in Finnish football
1966 in Finnish football
1967 in Finnish football